Situation Normal is the second studio album by SNAFU.  
Peter Solley's fiddle lends this album a curious Country and Western tone in places, unusual for what was essentially an R&B band. But the album still contains a short version of the classic "Lock and Key" with Micky Moody's distinctive slide guitar.

Track listing
All tracks composed by Micky Moody, Peter Solley and Bobby Harrison:
 "No More"
 "No Bitter Taste"
 "Brown Eyed Beauty & The Blue Assed Fly"
 "Lock and Key"
 "Big Dog Lusty"
 "Playboy Blues"
 "Jessie Lee"
 "Ragtime Roll"

Personnel
Bobby Harrison - lead vocals, congas
Peter Solley - keyboards, synthesizer, fiddle
Micky Moody -  guitar, mandolin, harmonica
Colin Gibson - bass, cowbell
Terry Popple - drums, washboard

Horn section on "Ragtime Roll":
Mel Collins - alto and tenor saxophones
Steve Gregory - tenor saxophone
Bud Beadle - baritone saxophone

Other personnel

Martin Rushent - engineer
Bill Price - overdub engineer
Ashley Howe - vocals and final overdub engineer
Martin Dean - photography
Gregory Hodal - artwork

References

External links

1974 albums
Snafu (band) albums
Albums produced by Steve Rowland (record producer)